This is a list of fighter aces in World War II, ordered by national origin. See also List of World War II flying aces.

Australia
There were 103 air aces from Australia during the Second World War.  For more information, see List of World War II aces from Australia.

Austria
There were 51 air aces from Austria during the Second World War.  For more information, see List of World War II aces from Austria.

Belgium
There were 14 air aces from Belgium during the Second World War. For more information, see List of World War II aces from Belgium.

Bulgaria

Canada
There were 152 air aces from Canada during the Second World War.  For more information, see List of World War II aces from Canada.

China
There were more than 25 fighter aces from the China during the Second World War, although not all flew for the Allies. For more information, see List of World War II aces from China.

Croatia

From 1941 to 1945, the portion of Yugoslavia occupied by the Axis powers existed as the Independent State of Croatia, a puppet state of Nazi Germany. There were 25 fighter aces from the Independent State of Croatia, fighting for the Axis, during the Second World War.  see List of World War II aces from Croatia.

Czechoslovakia
There were more than 30 aces from Czechoslovakia during the Second World War.  see List of World War II aces from Czechoslovakia and List of World War II aces from Slovakia.

Denmark
There were 3 fighter aces from Denmark during the Second World War. For further information, see List of World War II aces from Denmark.

Finland
There were 96 fighter aces from Finland during the Second World War.  For further information, see List of World War II aces from Finland

France
There were more than 180 aces from France during the Second World War.  See List of World War II aces from France and List of Vichy France flying aces.

Germany
There were over 2,500 aces from Germany during the Second World War.  For a detailed list of 890 (updated as of October 2017) of these aces, see List of World War II aces from Germany

Greece

There were 6 air aces from Greece during the Second World War.

Hungary
There were 39 air aces from Hungary during the Second World War. For further information, see List of World War II aces from Hungary.

Ireland
There were more than 13 aces from Ireland during the Second World War., see List of World War II aces from Ireland.

Italy
There were more than 166 aces from Italy during the Second World War.   see List of World War II aces from Italy

Japan
There were approximately 335 aces from Japan during the Second World War.  see List of World War II aces from Japan

New Zealand
There were more than 80 aces from New Zealand during the Second World War.  For a complete list, see List of World War II aces from New Zealand.

Norway

There were 20 aces from Norway during the Second World War. For a complete list, see List of World War II aces from Norway.

Philippines
There were only two known aces of the Philippines during the Second World War.

* Jesús A. Villamor

* César Basa

Poland

There were 91 air aces from Poland during the Second World War. For further information, see List of World War II aces from Poland.

Rhodesia
There were 11 air aces from Rhodesia during the Second World War.  see List of World War II aces from Rhodesia.

Romania
There were 126 aces from Romania during the Second World War by Romanian 1944  standards. , see List of World War II flying aces from Romania.

Slovakia

There were 19 air aces from Slovakia during the Second World War. see List of World War II aces from Slovakia.and List of World War II aces from Czechoslovakia

South Africa
There were 59 aces from South Africa during the Second World War. ee List of World War II aces from South Africa

Soviet Union
Soviet Union produced the highest scoring allied aces during the Second World War. see List of World War II aces from the Soviet Union

Spain
There were 20 air aces from Spain during the Second World War, see List of World War II aces from Spain.

Sweden
William Y. Anderson as a Swedish-American pilot flying with U.S. Army Air Forces. 7 kills (+  V-1 "flying bomb" on  17 June 1944).

United Kingdom

There are 753 aces listed from the United Kingdom during the Second World War.

United States
There were 1297 aces from the United States during the Second World War, see List of World War II aces from the United States

See also
 Flying ace
 List of World War II air aces

References

 Country
Lists by country